Herbert Sausgruber (born July 24, 1946 in Bregenz) was governor of the Austrian state of Vorarlberg and chairman of the Vorarlberg ÖVP.

Education 

After the Matura (general qualification for university entrance), Sausgruber he studied law and Catholic theology at the University of Innsbruck and become a member of the fraternity “AKV Tirolia”. He graduated in 1970 in jurisprudence.

As public servant
After a year working in a court he was admitted to the public service. First he served as the chief of the youth welfare office in the counties of Bludenz, Feldkirch and Bregenz. After 1975 he worked in the office of the government of Vorarlberg.

As politician 

From 1975 on, he was vestryman in Höchst, from 1978 on chief of the parish council. In 1979 he became a member of the Vorarlberg Landtag. In 1981 he became Klubobmann of the ÖVP in the Landtag, 1986 he became the chairman of the Vorarlberg ÖVP. In 1990, he became the vice governor of Vorarlberg and on April 2, 1997 the Landtag voted him in the post of the governor of the state. He held this position till 2011.

External links 

 Herbert Sausgrubers Website on the Site of the Vorarlberg Government
 Article about Sausgruber in the Austria Lexica of AEIO

1946 births
Living people
People from Bregenz
Austrian People's Party politicians
Governors of Vorarlberg
Recipients of the Order of Merit of Baden-Württemberg